Argentala is a genus of moths of the family Notodontidae. It consists of the following species:
Argentala argoptera Miller, 2008
Argentala brehmi Miller, 2008
Argentala mesitana  (Dognin, 1917) 
Argentala subalba  (Walker, 1859) 
Argentala subcaesia  (Prout, 1918) 
Argentala subcoerulea  (Warren, 1901) 

Notodontidae of South America